Qepchaq Rural District is in the Central District of Chaharborj County, West Azerbaijan province, Iran. The constituent villages of the rural district were in the former Marhemetabad District of Miandoab County. The district was separated from the county, elevated to the status of Chaharborj County, and divided into two districts in 2020: the Central and Firuzabad Districts. The capital of the newly established rural district is the village of Qepchaq, whose population at the National Census of 2016 was 3,669 in 1,098 households.

References 

Rural Districts of West Azerbaijan Province

Populated places in West Azerbaijan Province

fa:دهستان قپچاق